The Papuan Gulf languages are a proposed language family of Papuan languages spoken inland from the large gulf that defines the shape of southern Papua New Guinea.

Languages
Kikorian (Kikori River)
Kutubuan
Turama–Kikorian
Strickland (Strickland and Soari River)
East Strickland
Doso–Turumsa
Gogodala–Suki (Suki–Aramia River)
Tua River
Teberan
Wiru
Pawaia

Lexical comparison
The lexical data below is from the Trans-New Guinea database and Usher (2020), unless noted otherwise. Neighboring languages not traditionally classified within Papuan Gulf are also included for comparison.

References

Further reading
Franklin, K. editor. The linguistic situation in the Gulf District and adjacent areas, Papua New Guinea. C-26, x + 607 pages. Pacific Linguistics, The Australian National University, 1973. 

 
Languages of Papua New Guinea
Proposed language families
Papuan languages